Robin Hood is a 1953 six-episode British television series starring Patrick Troughton as Robin Hood and Wensley Pithey as Friar Tuck. It was written by Max Kester, and produced and directed by Joy Harington for the BBC. The 1953 series was the first TV production of Robin Hood, although the 1955 series, The Adventures of Robin Hood, remains better known.

The 30-minute episodes were transmitted live, and only eight minutes from the second episode, The Abbot of St. Mary's, the earliest surviving footage of Troughton's television career, exists (as a 16mm telerecording). Troughton's son Michael mistakenly claimed in his father's biography that the full episode survived. Short clips of this material appeared in 2007 documentary, presented by Jonathan Ross, covering Robin Hood from its beginnings to the more recent BBC production (2006), and were also shown as an example of television production in the BBC documentary series Children's T.V. On Trial The 1950s. The surviving footage was also included on the 2020 DVD and Blu-Ray release of an animated reconstruction of the Doctor Who serial The Power of the Daleks, which also starred Patrick Troughton.

Cast

 Patrick Troughton as Robin Hood
 Wensley Pithey as Friar Tuck
 Kenneth Mackintosh as Little John
 Dudley Jones as Much
 John Breslin as Alan-a-Dale
 David Kossoff as Sheriff of Nottingham
 Philip Guard as Will Scarlett
 David Markham as King Edward I

Episodes

 Gathering the Band (17 March 1953)
 The Abbot Of St. Mary's (23 March 1953)
 Who is Robin? (31 March 1953)
 The Silver Arrow (7 April 1953)
 A King Comes To Greenwood (14 April 1953)
 The Secret (21 April 1953)

References

External links

1950s British drama television series
BBC television dramas
Robin Hood television series
Period television series
1953 British television series debuts
1953 British television series endings
British drama television series
Lost BBC episodes